Zavara or Zavareh is an Iranian hero in Ferdowsi's Shahnameh. He was brother to Rostam and the son of Zal and played an important role in the Iranian invasion of Turan after the murder of Siyavash by the command of the Turanian king, Afrasiyab. It is said that Zavara killed the Turanian prince Sokhra in the way that the Turanians killed the Iranian prince Siyavash.

Zavara was killed by his half-brother, Shaghad.

References 
Shahnameh characters

Kayanians